Ussuriysk railway station is railway station and railway junction of Trans-Siberian Railway and Chinese Eastern Railway in Ussuriysk, Primorsky Krai, Russia. It belongs to the Vladivostok branch of the Far Eastern Railway.

References

Railway stations in the Russian Empire opened in 1893
Railway stations in Primorsky Krai
Cultural heritage monuments of regional significance in Primorsky Krai